Carlos Moyá defeated David Nalbandian in the final, 6–3, 6–3, 6–1 to win the men's singles tennis title at the 2004 Italian Open.

Félix Mantilla was the defending champion, but lost in the second round to Mariano Zabaleta.

Seeds
A champion seed is indicated in bold text while text in italics indicates the round in which that seed was eliminated.

  Roger Federer (second round)
  Andy Roddick (first round)
  Rainer Schüttler (first round)
  Tim Henman (third round)
  David Nalbandian (final)
  Carlos Moyá (champion)
  Sébastien Grosjean (second round)
  Nicolás Massú (quarterfinals)
  Mark Philippoussis (first round)
  Paradorn Srichaphan (second round)
  Sjeng Schalken (second round)
  Jiří Novák (quarterfinals)
  Fernando González (second round)
  Martin Verkerk (second round)
  Lleyton Hewitt (second round)
  Juan Ignacio Chela (first round)

Draw

Finals

Top half

Section 1

Section 2

Bottom half

Section 3

Section 4

External links
 2004 Internazionali BNL d'Italia Singles draw

Men's Singles
Italian Open - Singles